Tridib Chaudhuri  (12 December 1911 – 11 May 1997) was an Indian politician and Indian independence activist. He was a leader and founder of the Revolutionary Socialist Party and a member of Lok Sabha from Baharampur in West Bengal in India. He was the joint opposition candidate for 1974 Indian presidential election and became the first Bengali to participate in the presidential election in India. He was member of Lok Sabha from 1952 to 1984 and a member of Rajya Sabha from 1987 to 1997 until his death. He had participated in Goa Liberation Movement. He was one of the founders of the Revolutionary Socialist Party.

He passed his BA examination in 1933 and subsequently MA in economics from the University of Calcutta as an external candidate from jail, when he was imprisoned for sedition against the colonial rule.

Lok Sabha experience

Tridib Chaudhuri was present in seven Lok Sabhas.

• 1st Lok Sabha

• 2nd Lok Sabha

• 3rd Lok Sabha

• 4th Lok Sabha

• 5th Lok Sabha

• 6th Lok Sabha

• 7th Lok Sabha

1974 Indian Presidential Election

On 17 August 1974, the Election Commission of India held indirect 6th presidential elections of India. Tridib Chaudhuri lost to Fakhruddin Ali Ahmed by a margin of 189,196 votes.

Books

• The Swing Back: A Critical Survey of the Devious Zig-zags of CPI, Political Line (1947–50).

References

1911 births
1997 deaths
Revolutionary Socialist Party (India) politicians
West Bengal politicians
India MPs 1952–1957
India MPs 1957–1962
India MPs 1962–1967
India MPs 1967–1970
India MPs 1971–1977
India MPs 1977–1979
India MPs 1980–1984
Rajya Sabha members from West Bengal
Candidates for President of India
University of Calcutta alumni
Lok Sabha members from West Bengal
People from Murshidabad district
Krishnath College alumni